Jing Ke (died 227 BC) was a youxia during the late Warring States period of Ancient China. As a retainer of Crown Prince Dan of the Yan state, he was infamous for his failed assassination attempt on King Zheng of the Qin state, who later became Qin Shi Huang, the Qin Dynasty's first emperor (from 221 BC to 210 BC).  His story is told in the chapter titled Biographies of Assassins (刺客列傳) in Sima Qian's Records of the Grand Historian.

Background
In 230 BC, the Qin state began conquering other states as part of King Zheng's ambition to unify the country under one rule.  The Qin army, having already achieved absolute military supremacy over the other states since 260 BC, first successfully annihilated the state of Han, the weakest of the Seven Warring States. Two years later, the once-formidable Zhao state was also conquered in 236 BC.

Zhao's northeastern neighbor, the Yan state was next in line to be threatened by Qin expansion. In exchange for peace, King Xi of Yan had earlier forced his son Crown Prince Dan to be held a diplomatic hostage in the Qin, but Prince Dan returned knowing that Qin was far stronger than Yan and would attack it sooner or later.

Jing Ke originally came from the minor Wey state. He was of the clan name Qing (庆氏) of the ancestral name Jiang (姜姓) and a distant descendant of Wukui of Qi, had good education and was proficient in the art of the sword.  His homeland of Wey was annexed by Qin in 239 BC, and Jing Ke fled to Yan. A youxia named Tian Guang (田光) first introduced him to Prince Dan. There Jing Ke accepted the hospitality of Prince Dan, who, as a last resort, decided to send an assassin against the King of Qin. The plan involved either kidnapping the king and forcing him to release the territories from his control; or failing this, killing him. The expectation in either case was that Qin would be left disorganized, enabling the other remaining major states to unite against its conquest.

Assassination plot

Planning 
In 228 BC, the Qin army was already at the Zhao capital of Handan, and was waiting to approach the state of Yan. Jing Ke agreed to go to Qin and pretend to be a nobleman begging for mercy. According to events at the time, Dukang (督亢) (in present-day Hebei Province) was the first part of the Yan state that the Qin wanted, by reason of its fertile farmland. The plan was to present as gifts the map of Dukang and the severed head of the traitorous Qin general Huan Yi to the king of Qin, in order to approach him.

At the time, General Huan Yi had lost favor with Qin and wanted revenge against it; whereas the Qin state put a bounty on capturing him of 1,000 gold pieces. Jing Ke went to Huan himself to discuss the assassination plan. Huan Yi believed that the plan would work, and agreed to commit suicide so that his head could be collected.

Prince Dan then obtained the sharpest possible dagger, refined it with poison, and gave it to Jing Ke. To accompany him, Prince Dan assigned Qin Wuyang as his assistant.  Qin Wuyang was known to have successfully committed murder at the age of 13.

In 227 BC, Prince Dan and other guests wore white clothing and white hats at the Yi River (易水) to send the pair of assassins off. Jing Ke reportedly sang a song "the wind blows, the Yi river freezes. The hero fords once, never to return!" (風蕭蕭兮易水寒，壯士一去兮不復還). The King of Qin received the message of visitors presenting a gift to him, and was willing to receive them at the city.

The attempt 

Concealing the dagger inside the map scroll, Jing Ke and Qin Wuyang represented the Yan as ambassadors and met with King Zheng.  Qin Wuyang reportedly became so nervous that he acted almost paralyzed when entering the palace, and Jing Ke managed the excuse that his partner had never set eyes on the grace of Son of Heaven.  Other sources suggest Jing Ke described Qin Wuyang as a rural boy who had never seen the world and was suffering a cultural shock.  The panicked Qin Wuyang was then barred from moving up the palace, and Jing Ke was ordered to present the map alone.

Jing Ke approached King Zheng and politely presented the map scroll.  When the King Zheng unrolled the map, Jing Ke immediately seized the revealed dagger, grabbed the king's clothes and attacked him, who somehow managed to back away from the initial thrust by tearing off a sleeve in the process.  While King Zheng fled from his attacker on foot, he attempted to draw his own sword hanging from his belt, but was unable to do so while running desperately as it was a very long ceremonial sword.  None of the other Qin officials within the vicinity were armed and able to stop Jing Ke, and the guards were all stationed outside the palace and were unable to immediately reach the scene.  In the confusion Jing Ke began to close in on the king, who struggled to get away from the assassin by circling behind a pillar.

Seeing the king in grave danger, a royal physician named Xia Wuju (夏無且) grabbed his own medicine bag and hurled it at Jing Ke, which slowed down the assassin just enough to allow King Zheng to recover some distance.  Reminded by cries from other officials, the king managed to shift his longsword behind his back and unsheathe it from behind.  Now armed, he immediately turned back and struck Jing Ke in the thigh, effectively immobilizing him.  The injured Jing Ke, out of a desperate last attempt, threw his dagger towards King Zheng, only to miss the target. The king then proceeded to stab Jing Ke eight more times, mortally wounding him.  Knowing it was hopelessly over, the dying Jing Ke sat with his legs stretched forward and apart (a posture then considered very rude), and used the last of his strength to taunt King Zheng with abuses.  At this point, the guards had arrived at the scene to finish off both Jing Ke and the fleeing Qin Wuyang.

It was recorded that right after the incident, King Zheng sat on his throne catatonically holding the sword due to the exhaustion caused by the adrenaline rush, before he finally recovered after a short while and thanked the physician Xia Wuju for attempting to stop the assassin.

Yan annihilation
After Jing Ke's attempt, the Qin army general Wang Jian was sent against the Yan state. In 226 BC, Prince Dan sent his army to fight at Ji (薊), but were soon defeated. In an effort to try to appease the King of Qin, King Xi of Yan put his son to death; however, the Yan were annexed and destroyed nonetheless.

In popular culture 
The Chinese film The Emperor and the Assassin (1999), featuring Gong Li and others, is based on the aforementioned events. 
A Chinese TV series called Assassinator Jing Ke (荆轲传奇) was produced in 2004, depicting a fictionalized biography of Jing Ke, starring Liu Ye, Wang Yanan, and Peter Ho.
 Jing Ke's story is the basis of the plot of Katanagatari.
Jing Ke is the protagonist of the short story "The Circle" by Liu Cixin.
 Jing Ke appears in the fictional historical drama The King's Woman based on the novel The Legend of Qin: Li Ji Story (秦时明月之丽姬传).
 Nobel laureate Mo Yan wrote a play in 2003, entitled "Our Jing Ke"  (我们的荆轲), which retells the story of Jing Ke's failed assassination attempt. The play premiered in August 2011 in Beijing by Beijing People's Art Theatre (BPAT). The play won the highest drama award in China in 2012.
 Jing Ke appears in the mobile game Fate/Grand Order as an Assassin class Servant. This version of Jing Ke appears as a woman, and the game notes she was recorded in history as a man for unknown reasons. Her personal quest revolves around her failed attempt.

See also
Gao Jianli

References

External links 
 

227 BC deaths
Failed regicides
Zhou dynasty people
Year of birth unknown
Chinese assassins
Wey (state)
Qin (state)
Yan (state)
Qin Shi Huang
Violent deaths in China
Chinese courtiers
3rd-century BC Chinese people